Rutuls, Rutulians are a Northeast Caucasian ethnic group native to Dagestan and adjacent parts of Azerbaijan. According to the 2010 Russian Census, there were 35,240 Rutuls in Russia. In 1989 Soviet Census in Azerbaijan (Azerbaijan SSR then) there were 336 Rutuls. The Rutul language is a member of the Northeast Caucasian language family; its speakers often have a good command of Azeri and Russian, as Rutul was not a written language until 1990. The Rutul culture is close to that of the Tsakhur and other peoples who inhabit the basin of the upper reaches of the Samur River. Most of the Rutuls are engaged in cattle breeding (mostly sheep husbandry), farming, and gardening.

Religion
The Rutuls adhere to Sunni Islam. The earliest attempts of Arabs to affirm as Dagestan concern the 7th century, and in Rutul's territory they made the greatest success. The earliest monument of Muslim culture testifies to it on caucasus - a tombstone of Sheikh Magomeda-ibn-Asada-ibn-Mugal, buried in Khnov in 675 AD About early Islamisation of Rutuls the earliest testify also in mountains of Dagestan monuments building epigraphic, found in some Rutul villages. It is a stone in a wall of a building of a mosque of settlement village Luchek on which the chronograph text in the Arabian language is cut, Islam carrying the statement here to 128 of Hijra, that is 745-746. Other stone with the chronograph text has remained in a settlement Ihrek mosque of Ihrek, in it is spoken «about restoration of the destroyed mosque in 407 of Hijra»

Notable Rutul people
 Gasret Aliev - a Hero of Soviet Union, 1st secretary of the CPSU in Rutul 1957–1961, resident of the village Hin, participant of World War II.

Science
 Saeed Efendi I (v. Shinaz, 13th century, dynasty of Saeedar) - the medieval philosopher, rhetoric, the physicist, the astronomer, the poet. It had been opened in village Shinaz medieval university, an observatory and library. Last scientist from this dynasty Ismail Efendi have buried in 1929.
 Verdiev Mikail Gadjimagomedovich - Heads physics chair at the Dagestan State technical university (since July, 2004), the senior lecturer of engineering science, the professor, the full member of the International academy the Colds (M.O.V.E.), the Deserved inventor of the Russian Federation and Republic of Dagestan.
 Musaev Gamzat Magomedsaidovich - the senior lecturer of chair of history of Dagestan State University.

Other scientists
 Gasan Gagaev
 Kamal Efendiev (v. Ihrek)
 Ali Sultanov
 Alisultan Alisultanov
 Fatima Magomedova
 Farida Guseynova
 Svetlana Mahmudova (v. Rutul)
 Serker Gadjiev
 Ahmed Bazaev
 Abdulkasum Balamamedov
 Efendi Hasmamedov (v. Shinaz)
 Balasi Tagirov
 Tel'man Kafarov
 Eldigar Agabalaev (v. Hin)
 Gadji Gadjiev
 Verdiev Verdi (v. Myuhrek)

Sports
 Vagif Abdullaev (birth 1983-11-20) (village Luchek) - the World champion on a kickboxing, the Champion of Europe on Full Contact (WPKA) 2005 in an absolute category and in a category to 82 kg, the World champion on Full Contact (IAKSA) 2007. Trains in fight club "Salang" (Surgut, Russia), the participant of the International Tournament of Single combats.
 Kurban Agaev (village Hin) - the numerous champion of the USSR on free-style wrestling.
 Vagab Kazibekov - the deserved master of sports of the USSR, the champion of the USSR and Europe.
 Saniyat Ganachueva (village Shinaz) - the first Russian world champion among women on free-style wrestling.
 Abduselim Rizvanov - the deserved trainer of Russia.
 Caucas Sultanmagomedov - MMA fighter.
 Asef Pirsaidov - Master of Sports Soviet Union on free-style wrestling.
 Marif Pirav - MMA fighter of EFN and KSW.

Rutuls in Turkey
 İbrahim Şinasi I (19th century) - the large military leader of Turkey. Was lost under Shumla.
 İbrahim Şinasi (junior) - after study in France began to let out the most popular newspaper in Turkey «Gyasfiru efkyar» («the Image of thoughts»). Şinasi has taken a great interest in reform of Turkish language, creation of the present Turkish literature and achieved, that books wrote not for the elite, and for the people. Besides, Şinasi with Namik Kemal was engaged in reform of a state system of Turkey and became the founder of tanzimat, continued by Atatürk in 1918-1919.

Rutuls in Syria
 Ulfat Idilbi - the famous writer. Elfat has not torn with the ethnic native land of the ancestors, has visited village Shinaz, is interested in a life and customs of rutuls.
 Sheikh Gadzhimagomed Chelebi (great-grandfather Elfat Edelbi) - has got to Turkey as the emissary of imam Shamil, as the proxy envoy to the Turkish sultan.
 Shamil Dagestani

Culture and art 
 Kur Radjab Ihrekdy – the classic of rutul poetry which verses sing till now poets of Dagestan and Azerbaijan. His used huge popularity in second half XVIII – the beginning of 19th centuries in Dagestan and Azerbaijan.
 Hazarchi – a national poet (first half of the 20th century)
 Gadzhiev – a national poet (first half of the 20th century)
 Jamiseb Sallarov – a national poet (first half of the 20th century)
 Samed – a national poet (first half of the 20th century)
 Nurahmed Ramazanov – a national poet (first half of the 20th century)
 Garay Fazli – a poet.
 Ismail Dagestanly – an honoured artist of the USSR, the winner of the Lenin award
 Yosoof Ihrekdy – a writer and poet. Creativity — 1960–1990
 Shafi Amsarsdy – a poet and composer. Creativity – 1960–1990
 Kavha (Abdulmanaf) Vurushdy – a poet, writer, and composer. Creativity – 1960–1990
 Sakit Hinavi – a poet, writer, and composer, «the Nightingale of Dagestan and Azerbaijan»

Other famous Rutuls
 K.Magomedov - a member of the Russian academy of public service at the president of the Russian Federation
 G.Gadzhimuradov - the deputy minister of trade of Degestan Republic (Russia)
 I.Ibragimov - the head of department at Government of Degestan Republic (Russia)
 D.Tairov - the chief of department Minnatsinformvneshsvjazi of Degestan Republic (Russia)
 T.Ashurbekov - the head of department of republican Office of Public Prosecutor
 M.Babayev - the colonel, chief of Department Makhachkala-customs
 I.Garunov - a member of Supreme Court of Degestan Republic (Russia)
 N.Magomedov - the head of joint-stock company "Arsi".
 R.Aliev - the deputy director of joint-stock company "Yugstalkonstructsia"
 M.Mamadaev - the colonel
 J.Magomedov - the judge of the Kirov (Dagestan, Russia) regional court

See also
Rutul language

Notes

External links
Folk Songs and Dances of the Rutuls of Azerbaijan
 rutulia.com — Rutul national website.

Ethnic groups in Dagestan
Ethnic groups in Azerbaijan
Muslim communities of Russia
Peoples of the Caucasus
Rutulsky District
Muslim communities of the Caucasus